Carex arcta is a species of sedge known by the common name northern cluster sedge. It is native to northern North America including most of Canada and northern parts of the United States. It grows in wet areas, especially in coniferous forests. The leaves are pale green to grayish, flat, and have reddish or purple-dotted sheaths at the base, and they are sometimes longer than the stems. The fruit is covered in a sac called a perigynium which is greenish and veined with a reddish tip.

External links
Jepson Manual Treatment
USDA Plants Profile
Flora of North America
Photo gallery

arcta
Flora of North America
Plants described in 1867